The Republic is a Socratic dialogue, authored by Plato around 375 BCE, concerning justice, the order and character of the just city-state, and the just man. It is Plato's best-known work, and one of the world's most influential works of philosophy and political theory, both intellectually and historically.

In the dialogue, Socrates discusses the meaning of justice and whether the just man is happier than the unjust man with various Athenians and foreigners. He considers the natures of existing regimes and then proposes a series of hypothetical cities in comparison, culminating in Kallipolis (Καλλίπολις), a utopian city-state ruled by a philosopher-king. They also discuss ageing, love, theory of forms, the immortality of the soul, and the role of the philosopher and of poetry in society. The dialogue's setting seems to be the time of the Peloponnesian War.

Place in Plato's corpus
The Republic is generally placed in the middle period of Plato's dialogues—that is, it is believed to be written after the early period dialogues but before the late period dialogues. However, the distinction of this group from the early dialogues is not as clear as the distinction of the late dialogues from all the others. Nonetheless, Ritter, Arnim, and Baron—with their separate methodologies—all agreed that the Republic was well distinguished, along with Parmenides, Phaedrus and Theaetetus.

However, the first book of the Republic, which shares many features with earlier dialogues, is thought to have originally been written as a separate work, and then the remaining books were conjoined to it, perhaps with modifications to the original of the first book.

Outline

Books I–II: Aging, Love and the Definitions of Justice

While visiting the city of Piraeus with Glaucon, Polemarchus tells Socrates to join him for a romp. They eventually end up at Polemarchus' house where Socrates encounters Polemarchus' father Cephalus.

In his first philosophical conversation with the group members, Socrates gets into a conversation with Cephalus. The first real philosophical question posed by Plato in the book is when Socrates asks “is life painful at that age, or what report do you make of it?” when speaking to Cephalus who is older than Socrates.

Plato is seemingly interested with aging and love and in what effect they will have on him. It is a brief but salient point and the book's first real discussion.

Cephalus answers by saying that many are unhappy about old age because they miss their youth. But he then says that he has met other men who do not feel this way. Cephalus mentions a story that when he was in the presence of one of these men named Sophocles and he was asked “how do you feel about love, Sophocles are you still capable of it? To which he replied, Hush! if you please: to my great delight I have escaped from it, and feel as if I have escaped from a frantic and savage master.” Cephalus states that he feels that Sophocles has spoken wisely and that “unquestionably for old age brings us profound repose and freedom from this (love) and other passions. When the appetites have abated, and their force is diminished, the description of Sophocles is perfectly realized. It is like being delivered from a multitude of furious masters.” This seems to set Socrates at ease and the conversations move on to discuss Justice.

Plato seems to be asking the question about both “love” (strong attachment and affection) and libido (sexual desire) in this section. Plato is indicating that as we age or enter the “threshold of age” (age above 65) we can escape/release/detach from our passions and desires (those frantic and savage masters) and can live contentedly in repose. It also seems to indicate that realizing this escape from earthly passions earlier in life could bring freedom, contentedness and repose earlier in life. One of Plato's famous quotes is "The greatest wealth is to live content with little."

Socrates then asks Cephalus, Polemarchus, and Thrasymachus for their definitions of justice. Cephalus defines justice as giving what is owed. Polemarchus says justice is "the art which gives good to friends and evil to enemies." Thrasymachus proclaims "justice is nothing else than the interest of the stronger." Socrates demolishes each in turn and says that it is to one's advantage to be just and disadvantage to be unjust. The first book ends in aporia concerning the essence of justice.

The first book proposes two definitions of justice but deemed inadequate. Returning debts owed, and helping friends while harming enemies, are commonsense definitions of justice that, Socrates shows, are inadequate, and thus lack the universality demanded of a definition. He does not completely reject them, for each expresses a commonsense notion that Socrates incorporates in books II through V.

At the end of Book I, Socrates agrees with Polemarchus that justice includes helping friends, but says the just man would never harm another. Thrasymachus believes that Socrates has done those present an injustice by saying this and attacks his character and reputation, partly because he suspects that Socrates does not believe that harming enemies is unjust. Thrasymachus gives his understanding of justice and injustice as "justice is what is advantageous to the stronger, while injustice is to one's own profit and advantage". Socrates asks whether the ruler who makes a mistake by making a law that lessens their well-being is still a just ruler according to that definition. Thrasymachus agrees that no just ruler would make such an error. This agreement allows Socrates to undermine Thrasymachus' definition by comparing rulers to people of various professions. Thrasymachus consents to Socrates' assertion that an artist is someone who does his job well, and is a practioner of some art, which allows him to complete the job well. In so doing Socrates gets Thrasymachus to admit that rulers who enact a law that does not benefit them firstly, are in the precise sense not rulers. Thrasymachus gives up, and falls silent. Socrates has trapped Thrasymachus into admitting that the strong man who makes a mistake is not strong in the precise sense, and that some type of knowledge is required to rule perfectly. However, it is far from a satisfactory definition of justice.

Book II The Ring of Gyges

Socrates believes he has answered Thrasymachus and is done with the discussion of justice. Socrates' young companions, Glaucon and Adeimantus, continue for the sake of furthering the discussion. Glaucon argues that the origin of justice was first in social contracts aimed at preventing one from suffering injustice, unable to take revenge, second that all those who practice justice do so unwillingly and out of fear of punishment, and third that the life of the unjust man is far more blessed than that of the just man. Glaucon would like Socrates to prove that justice is not only desirable, but that it belongs to the highest class of desirable things: those desired both for their own sake and for their consequences. To demonstrate the problem, he tells the story of Gyges, who – with the help of a ring that turns him invisible – achieves great advantages for himself by committing injustices.The only reason that men are just and praise justice is out of fear of punishment. The law is a product of compromise between individuals who agree not to treat others unjustly if others do the same. Glaucon says that if people had the power to withhold justice without fear of punishment, they would. Glaucon uses this argument to challenge Socrates to defend the position that the just life is better than the unjust life. Adeimantus adds to Glaucon's speech the charge that men are only just for the results that justice brings: fortune, honor, and reputation. Adeimantus challenges Socrates to prove that behaving justly is worth something in and of itself, not only as a means to an end.

After Glaucon's speech, Adeimantus adds that, in this thought experiment, the unjust should not fear divine judgement, since the very poets who wrote about such judgement also wrote that the gods would grant forgiveness to those who made religious sacrifice. Adeimantus demonstrates his reason by drawing two detailed portraits, an unjust man who grew wealthy by injustice, devoting a percentage of this gain to religion, thus rendering him innocent in the eyes of the gods.

Book II–IV: The city and the soul

Socrates suggests that they use the city as an image to seek how justice comes to be in the soul of an individual. After attributing the origin of society to the individual not being self-sufficient and having many needs which he cannot supply himself, they go on to describe the development of the city. Socrates first describes the "healthy state", but Glaucon considers this hardly different than "a city of pigs." Socrates then goes on to describe the luxurious city, which he calls "a fevered state". This requires a guardian class to defend and attack on its account.

This begins a discussion concerning the type of education that ought to be given to these guardians in their early years, including the topic of what kind of stories are appropriate. They conclude that stories that ascribe evil to the gods are untrue and should not be taught. They suggest that guardians should be educated in these four cardinal virtues: wisdom, courage, justice and temperance. They also suggest that the second part of the guardians' education should be in gymnastics. With physical training they will be able to live without needing frequent medical attention: physical training will help prevent illness and weakness. Socrates asserts that both male and female guardians be given the same education, that all wives and children be shared, and that they be prohibited from owning private property.

In the fictional tale known as the myth or parable of the metals, Socrates presents the Noble Lie (γενναῖον ψεῦδος, gennaion pseudos), to explain the origin of the three social classes. Socrates proposes and claims that if the people believed "this myth...[it] would have a good effect, making them more inclined to care for the state and one another." Socrates assumes each person will be happy engaging in the occupation that suits them best. If the city as a whole is happy, then individuals are happy. In the physical education and diet of the guardians, the emphasis is on moderation, since both poverty and excessive wealth will corrupt them (422a1). Without controlling their education, the city cannot control the future rulers. Socrates says that it is pointless to worry over specific laws, like those pertaining to contracts, since proper education ensures lawful behavior, and poor education causes lawlessness (425a–425c).

Socrates proceeds to search for wisdom, courage, and temperance in the city, on the grounds that justice will be easier to discern in what remains (427e). They find wisdom among the guardian rulers, courage among the guardian warriors (or auxiliaries), temperance among all classes of the city in agreeing about who should rule and who should be ruled. Finally, Socrates defines justice in the city as the state in which each class performs only its own work, not meddling in the work of the other classes (433b).

The virtues discovered in the city are then sought in the individual soul. For this purpose, Socrates creates an analogy between the parts of the city and the soul (the city–soul analogy). He argues that psychological conflict points to a divided soul, since a completely unified soul could not behave in opposite ways towards the same object, at the same time, and in the same respect (436b). He gives examples of possible conflicts between the rational, spirited, and appetitive parts of the soul, corresponding to the rulers, auxiliaries, and producing classes in the city. Having established the tripartite soul, Socrates defines the virtues of the individual. A person is wise if he is ruled by the part of the soul that knows “what is beneficial for each part and for the whole,” courageous if his spirited part “preserves in the midst of pleasures and pains” the decisions reached by the rational part, and temperate if the three parts agree that the rational part lead (442c–d). They are just if each part of the soul attends to its function and not the function of another. It follows from this definition that one cannot be just if one doesn't have the other cardinal virtues.

Book V–VI: The Ship of State

Socrates, having to his satisfaction defined the just constitution of both city and psyche, moves to elaborate upon the four unjust constitutions of these. Adeimantus and Polemarchus interrupt, asking Socrates instead first to explain how the sharing of wives and children in the guardian class is to be defined and legislated, a theme first touched on in Book III. Socrates is overwhelmed at their request, categorizing it as three "waves" of attack against which his reasoning must stand firm. These three waves challenge Socrates' claims that

 both male and female guardians ought to receive the same education
 human reproduction ought to be regulated by the state and all offspring should be ignorant of their actual biological parents
 such a city and its corresponding philosopher-king could actually come to be in the real world.

In Books V–VII the abolition of riches among the guardian class (not unlike Max Weber's bureaucracy) leads controversially to the abandonment of the typical family, and as such no child may know his or her parents and the parents may not know their own children. Socrates tells a tale which is the "allegory of the good government". The rulers assemble couples for reproduction, based on breeding criteria. Thus, stable population is achieved through eugenics and social cohesion is projected to be high because familial links are extended towards everyone in the city. Also the education of the youth is such that they are taught of only works of writing that encourage them to improve themselves for the state's good, and envision (the) god(s) as entirely good, just, and the author(s) of only that which is good.

Socrates' argument is that in the ideal city, a true philosopher with understanding of forms will facilitate the harmonious co-operation of all the citizens of the city—the governance of a city-state is likened to the command of a ship, the Ship of State. This philosopher-king must be intelligent, reliable, and willing to lead a simple life. However, these qualities are rarely manifested on their own, and so they must be encouraged through education and the study of the Good.

Book VI–VII: Allegories of the Sun, Divided Line, and Cave

The Allegory of the Cave primarily depicts Plato's distinction between the world of appearances and the 'real' world of the Forms., Just as visible objects must be illuminated in order to be seen, so must also be true of objects of knowledge if light is cast on them.

Plato imagines a group of people who have lived their entire lives as prisoners, chained to the wall of a cave in the subterranean so they are unable to see the outside world behind them. However a constant flame illuminates various moving objects outside, which are silhouetted on the wall of the cave visible to the prisoners. These prisoners, through having no other experience of reality, ascribe forms to these shadows such as either "dog" or "cat". Plato then goes on to explain how the philosopher is akin to a prisoner who is freed from the cave. The prisoner is initially blinded by the light, but when he adjusts to the brightness he sees the fire and the statues and how they caused the images witnessed inside the cave. He sees that the fire and statues in the cave were just copies of the real objects; merely imitations. This is analogous to the Forms. What we see from day to day are merely appearances, reflections of the Forms. The philosopher, however, will not be deceived by the shadows and will hence be able to see the 'real' world, the world above that of appearances; the philosopher will gain knowledge of things in themselves. At the end of this allegory, Plato asserts that it is the philosopher's burden to reenter the cave. Those who have seen the ideal world, he says, have the duty to educate those in the material world. Since the philosopher recognizes what is truly good only he is fit to rule society according to Plato.

Book VIII–IX: Plato's five regimes
In Books VIII–IX stand Plato's criticism of the forms of government. Plato categorized governments into five types of regimes': aristocracy, timocracy, oligarchy, democracy, and tyranny.

The starting point is an imagined, alternate aristocracy (ruled by a philosopher-king); a just government ruled by a philosopher king, dominated by the wisdom-loving element. Aristocracy degenerates into timocracy when, due to miscalculation on the part of its governing class, the next generation includes persons of an inferior nature, inclined not just to cultivating virtues but also producing wealth. In a timocracy, governors will apply great effort in gymnastics and the arts of war, as well as the virtue that pertains to them, that of courage. As the emphasis on honor is compromised by wealth accumulation, it is replaced by oligarchy. The oligarchic government is dominated by the desiring element, in which the rich are the ruling class. Oligarchs do, however, value at least one virtue, that of temperance and moderation—not out of an ethical principle or spiritual concern, but because by dominating wasteful tendencies they succeed in accumulating money. 
As this socioeconomic divide grows, so do tensions between social classes. From the conflicts arising out of such tensions, the poor majority overthrow the wealthy minority, and democracy replaces the oligarchy preceding it. In democracy, the lower class grows bigger and bigger. A visually appealing demagogue is soon lifted up to protect the interests of the lower class, who can exploit them to take power in order to maintain order. Democracy then degenerates into tyranny where no one has discipline and society exists in chaos. In a tyrannical government, the city is enslaved to the tyrant, who uses his guards to remove the best social elements and individuals from the city to retain power (since they pose a threat), while leaving the worst. He will also provoke warfare to consolidate his position as leader. In this way, tyranny is the most unjust regime of all.

In parallel to this, Socrates considers the individual or soul that corresponds to each of these regimes. He describes how an aristocrat may become weak or detached from political and material affluence, and how his son will respond to this by becoming overly ambitious.The timocrat in turn may be defeated by the courts or vested interests; his son responds by accumulating wealth in order to gain power in society and defend himself against the same predicament, thereby becoming an oligarch. The oligarch's son will grow up with wealth without having to practice thrift or stinginess, and will be tempted and overwhelmed by his desires, so that he becomes democratic, valuing freedom above all. The democratic man is torn between tyrannical passions and oligarchic discipline, and ends up in the middle ground: valuing all desires, both good and bad. The tyrant will be tempted in the same way as the democrat, but without an upbringing in discipline or moderation to restrain him. Therefore, his most base desires and wildest passions overwhelm him, and he becomes driven by lust, using force and fraud to take whatever he wants. The tyrant is both a slave to his lusts, and a master to whomever he can enslave. Socrates points out the human tendency to be corrupted by power leads down the road to timocracy, oligarchy, democracy and tyranny. From this, he concludes that ruling should be left to philosophers, who are the most just and therefore least susceptible to corruption. This "good city" is depicted as being governed by philosopher-kings; disinterested persons who rule not for their personal enjoyment but for the good of the city-state (polis). The philosophers have seen the "Forms" and therefore know what is good. They understand the corrupting effect of greed and own no property and receive no salary. They also live in sober communism, eating and sleeping together.

Book X: Myth of Er

Concluding a theme brought up most explicitly in the Analogies of the Sun and Divided Line in Book VI, Socrates finally rejects any form of imitative art and concludes that such artists have no place in the just city. He continues on to argue for the immortality of the psyche and even espouses a theory of reincarnation. He finishes by detailing the rewards of being just, both in this life and the next. Artists create things but they are only different copies of the idea of the original. 
"And whenever any one informs us that he has found a man who knows all the arts, and all things else that anybody knows, and every single thing with a higher degree of accuracy than any other man—whoever tells us this, I think that we can only imagine to be a simple creature who is likely to have been deceived by some wizard or actor whom he met, and whom he thought all-knowing, because he himself was unable to analyze the nature of knowledge and ignorance and imitation."

He speaks about illusions and confusion. Things can look very similar, but be different in reality. Because we are human, at times we cannot tell the difference between the two.

With all of us, we may approve of something, as long we are not directly involved with it. If we joke about it, we are supporting it.

Sometimes we let our passions rule our actions or way of thinking, although they should be controlled, so that we can increase our happiness.

Legacy
Ancient Greece and Rome

Aristotle systematises many of Plato's analyses in his Politics, and criticizes the propositions of several political philosophers for the ideal city-state.

Zeno of Citium, the founder of Stoicism, wrote his version of an ideal society, Zeno's Republic, in opposition to Plato's Republic. Zeno's Republic was controversial and was viewed with some embarrassment by some of the later Stoics due to its defenses of free love, incest, and cannibalism and due to its opposition to ordinary education and the building of temples, law-courts, and gymnasia.

The English title of Plato's dialogue is derived from Cicero's De re publica, written some three centuries later. Cicero's dialogue imitates Plato's style and treats many of the same topics, and Cicero's main character Scipio Aemilianus expresses his esteem for Plato and Socrates.

Augustine of Hippo wrote his The City of God Augustine equally described a model of the "ideal city", in his case the eternal Jerusalem, using a visionary language not unlike that of the preceding philosophers.

 Middle Ages 
 Ibn Rushd 
Islamic philosophers were much more interested in Aristotle than Plato, but not having access to Aristotle's Politics, Ibn Rushd (Averroes) produced instead a commentary on
Plato's Republic. He advances an authoritarian ideal, following Plato's paternalistic model. Absolute monarchy, led by a philosopher-king, creates a justly ordered society. This requires extensive use of coercion, although persuasion is preferred and is possible if the young are properly raised. Rhetoric, not logic, is the appropriate road to truth for the common man. Demonstrative knowledge via philosophy and logic requires special study. Rhetoric aids religion in reaching the masses.

Following Plato, Ibn Rushd accepts the principle of women's equality. They should be educated and allowed to serve in the military; the best among them might be tomorrow's philosophers or rulers. He also accepts Plato's illiberal measures such as the censorship of literature. He uses examples from Arab history to illustrate just and degenerate political orders.

 Gratian 
The medieval jurist Gratian in his Decretum (ca 1140), quotes Plato as agreeing with him that "by natural law all things are common to all people." He identifies Plato's ideal society with the early Church as described in the Acts of the Apostles. "Plato lays out the order", Gratian comments, "for a very just republic in which no one considers anything his own."

Thomas More
Thomas More, when writing his Utopia, invented the technique of using the portrayal of a "utopia" as the carrier of his thoughts about the ideal society. More's island Utopia is also similar to Plato's Republic in some aspects, among them common property and the lack of privacy."The Function of the Ideal in Plato's 'Republic' and St. Thomas More's 'Utopia' " by K. Corrigan Moreana 1990, vol. 27, no.104, pp. 27-49"More on Utopia" by Brendan Bradshaw The Historical Journal, Vol. 24, No. 1 (Mar., 1981), pp. 1-27 JSTOR "claims that Utopia not merely emulated Plato's Republic but excelled it."

Hegel
Hegel respected Plato's theories of state and ethics much more than those of the early modern philosophers such as Locke, Hobbes and Rousseau, whose theories proceeded from a fictional "state of nature" defined by humanity's "natural" needs, desires and freedom. For Hegel this was a contradiction: since nature and the individual are contradictory, the freedoms which define individuality as such are latecomers on the stage of history. Therefore, these philosophers unwittingly projected man as an individual in modern society onto a primordial state of nature. Plato however had managed to grasp the ideas specific to his time:

For Hegel, Plato's Republic is not an abstract theory or ideal which is too good for the real nature of man, but rather is not ideal enough, not good enough for the ideals already inherent or nascent in the reality of his time; a time when Greece was entering decline. One such nascent idea was about to crush the Greek way of life: modern freedoms—or Christian freedoms in Hegel's view—such as the individual's choice of his social class, or of what property to pursue, or which career to follow. Such individual freedoms were excluded from Plato's Republic:

Greece being at a crossroads, Plato's new "constitution" in the Republic was an attempt to preserve Greece: it was a reactionary reply to the new freedoms of private property etc., that were eventually given legal form through Rome. Accordingly, in ethical life, it was an attempt to introduce a religion that elevated each individual not as an owner of property, but as the possessor of an immortal soul.

20th century

Mussolini admired Plato's The Republic, which he often read for inspiration. The Republic expounded a number of ideas that fascism promoted, such as rule by an elite promoting the state as the ultimate end, opposition to democracy, protecting the class system and promoting class collaboration, rejection of egalitarianism, promoting the militarization of a nation by creating a class of warriors, demanding that citizens perform civic duties in the interest of the state, and utilizing state intervention in education to promote the development of warriors and future rulers of the state. Plato was an idealist, focused on achieving justice and morality, while Mussolini and fascism were realist, focused on achieving political goals.

Martin Luther King Jr. nominated The Republic as the one book he would have taken to a deserted island, alongside the Bible.

21st century
In 2001, a survey of over 1,000 academics and students voted the Republic the greatest philosophical text ever written. Julian Baggini argued that although the work "was wrong on almost every point, the questions it raises and the methods it uses are essential to the western tradition of philosophy. Without it we might not have philosophy as we know it." In 2021, a survey showed that The Republic is the most studied book in the top universities in the United States.

Cultural influence
Plato's Republic has been influential in literature and art.
 Aldous Huxley's Brave New World has a dystopian government that bears a resemblance to the form of government described in the Republic, featuring the separation of people by professional class, assignment of profession and purpose by the state, and the absence of traditional family units, replaced by state-organized breeding. 
The Orwellian dystopia depicted in the novel 1984 had many characteristics in common with Plato's description of the allegory of the Cave as Winston Smith strives to liberate himself from it.
In the early 1970s the Dutch composer Louis Andriessen composed a vocal work called De Staat, based on the text of Plato's Republic.
In Robert A. Heinlein's Starship Troopers, his citizen can be compared to a Platonic Guardian, without the communal breeding and property, but still having a militaristic base. Although there are significant differences in the specifics of the system, Heinlein and Plato both describe systems of limited franchise, with a political class that has supposedly earned their power and wisely governs the whole. Republic is specifically attacked in Starship Troopers. The arachnids can be seen as much closer to a Republic society than the humans.
The film The Matrix models Plato's Allegory of the Cave.
In fiction, Jo Walton's 2015 novel The Just City explored the consequences of establishing a city-state based on the Republic in practice.
See also Ring of Gyges: Cultural influences

Criticism
Gadamer
In his 1934 Plato und die Dichter (Plato and the Poets), as well as several other works, Hans-Georg Gadamer describes the utopic city of the Republic as a heuristic utopia that should not be pursued or even be used as an orientation-point for political development. Rather, its purpose is said to be to show how things would have to be connected, and how one thing would lead to another—often with highly problematic results—if one would opt for certain principles and carry them through rigorously. This interpretation argues that large passages in Plato's writing are ironic, a line of thought initially pursued by Kierkegaard.

Popper
The city portrayed in the Republic struck some critics as harsh, rigid, and unfree; indeed, as totalitarian. Karl Popper gave a voice to that view in his 1945 book The Open Society and Its Enemies, where he singled out Plato's state as a dystopia. Popper distinguished Plato's ideas from those of Socrates, claiming that the former in his later years expressed none of the humanitarian and democratic tendencies of his teacher. Popper thought Plato's envisioned state totalitarian as it advocated a government composed only of a distinct hereditary ruling class, with the working class—who Popper argues Plato regards as "human cattle"—given no role in decision making. He argues that Plato has no interest in what are commonly regarded as the problems of justice—the resolution of disputes between individuals—because Plato has redefined justice as "keeping one's place".

Popper insists that the Republic "was meant by its author not so much as a theoretical treatise, but as a topical political manifesto", and Bertrand Russell argues that at least in intent, and all in all not so far from what was possible in ancient Greek city-states, the form of government portrayed in the Republic was meant as a practical one by Plato.

 Voegelin 
Many critics have suggested that the dialogue's political discussion actually serves as an analogy for the individual soul, in which there are also many different "members" that can either conflict or else be integrated and orchestrated under a just and productive "government." Among other things, this analogical reading would solve the problem of certain implausible statements Plato makes concerning an ideal political republic. Norbert Blössner (2007) argues that the Republic is best understood as an analysis of the workings and moral improvement of the individual soul with remarkable thoroughness and clarity. This view, of course, does not preclude a legitimate reading of the Republic as a political treatise (the work could operate at both levels). It merely implies that it deserves more attention as a work on psychology and moral philosophy than it has sometimes received.

Eric Voegelin in Plato and Aristotle (Baton Rouge, 1957), gave meaning to the concept of 'Just City in Speech' (Books II–V). For instance, there is evidence in the dialogue that Socrates himself would not be a member of his 'ideal' state. His life was almost solely dedicated to the private pursuit of knowledge. More practically, Socrates suggests that members of the lower classes could rise to the higher ruling class, and vice versa, if they had 'gold' in their veins—a version of the concept of social mobility. The exercise of power is built on the 'noble lie' that all men are brothers, born of the earth, yet there is a clear hierarchy and class divisions. There is a tripartite explanation of human psychology that is extrapolated to the city, the relation among peoples. There is no family among the guardians, another crude version of Max Weber's concept of bureaucracy as the state non-private concern. Together with Leo Strauss, Voegelin considered Popper's interpretation to be a gross misunderstanding not only of the dialogue itself, but of the very nature and character of Plato's entire philosophic enterprise.

The paradigm of the city—the idea of the Good, the Agathon—has manifold historical embodiments, undertaken by those who have seen the Agathon, and are ordered via the vision. The centerpiece of the Republic, Part II, nos. 2–3, discusses the rule of the philosopher, and the vision of the Agathon with the Allegory of the Cave, which is clarified in the theory of forms. The centerpiece is preceded and followed by the discussion of the means that will secure a well-ordered polis (city). Part II, no. 1, concerns marriage, the community of people and goods for the guardians, and the restraints on warfare among the Hellenes. It describes a partially communistic polis. Part II, no. 4, deals with the philosophical education of the rulers who will preserve the order and character of the city-state.

In part II, the Embodiment of the Idea, is preceded by the establishment of the economic and social orders of a polis (part I), followed by an analysis (part III) of the decline the order must traverse. The three parts compose the main body of the dialogues, with their discussions of the "paradigm", its embodiment, its genesis, and its decline.

The introduction and the conclusion are the frame for the body of the Republic. The discussion of right order is occasioned by the questions: "Is justice better than injustice?" and "Will an unjust man fare better than a just man?" The introductory question is balanced by the concluding answer: "Justice is preferable to injustice". In turn, the foregoing are framed with the Prologue (Book I) and the Epilogue (Book X). The prologue is a short dialogue about the common public doxai (opinions) about justice. Based upon faith, and not reason, the Epilogue describes the new arts and the immortality of the soul.

Strauss and Bloom
Some of Plato's proposals have led theorists like Leo Strauss and Allan Bloom to ask readers to consider the possibility that Socrates was creating not a blueprint for a real city, but a learning exercise for the young men in the dialogue. There are many points in the construction of the "Just City in Speech" that seem contradictory, which raise the possibility Socrates is employing irony to make the men in the dialogue question for themselves the ultimate value of the proposals. In turn, Plato has immortalized this 'learning exercise' in the Republic.

One of many examples is that Socrates calls the marriages of the ruling class 'sacred'; however, they last only one night and are the result of manipulating and drugging couples into predetermined intercourse with the aim of eugenically breeding guardian-warriors. Strauss and Bloom's interpretations, however, involve more than just pointing out inconsistencies; by calling attention to these issues they ask readers to think more deeply about whether Plato is being ironic or genuine, for neither Strauss nor Bloom present an unequivocal opinion, preferring to raise philosophic doubt over interpretive fact.

Strauss's approach developed out of a belief that Plato wrote esoterically. The basic acceptance of the exoteric-esoteric distinction revolves around whether Plato really wanted to see the "Just City in Speech" of Books V–VI come to pass, or whether it is just an allegory. Strauss never regarded this as the crucial issue of the dialogue. He argued against Karl Popper's literal view, citing Cicero's opinion that the Republic's true nature was to bring to light the nature of political things. In fact, Strauss undermines the justice found in the "Just City in Speech" by implying the city is not natural, it is a man-made conceit that abstracts away from the erotic needs of the body. The city founded in the Republic "is rendered possible by the abstraction from eros".

An argument that has been used against ascribing ironic intent to Plato is that Plato's Academy produced a number of tyrants who seized political power and abandoned philosophy for ruling a city. Despite being well-versed in Greek and having direct contact with Plato himself, some of Plato's former students like Clearchus, tyrant of Heraclea; Chaeron, tyrant of Pellene; Erastus and Coriscus, tyrants of Skepsis; Hermias of Atarneus and Assos; and Calippus, tyrant of Syracuse ruled people and did not impose anything like a philosopher-kingship. However, it can be argued whether these men became "tyrants" through studying in the academy. Plato's school had an elite student body, some of whom would by birth, and family expectation, end up in the seats of power. Additionally, it is important that it is by no means obvious that these men were tyrants in the modern, totalitarian sense of the concept. Finally, since very little is actually known about what was taught at Plato's Academy, there is no small controversy over whether it was even in the business of teaching politics at all.

Fragments
Several Oxyrhynchus Papyri fragments were found to contain parts of the Republic, and from other works such as Phaedo, or the dialogue Gorgias, written around 200–300 CE. Fragments of a different version of Plato's Republic were discovered in 1945, part of the Nag Hammadi library, written ca. 350 CE. These findings highlight the influence of Plato during those times in Egypt.

Translations

See also

Collectivism and individualism
Cultural influence of Plato's Republic
Mixed government
Nous
Plato's number

Notes

Further reading

External links

Texts of the Republic:
 Plato's Republic, translated by Benjamin Jowett (1892) with running comments & Stephanus numbers at Libertyfund.org
Plato's Republic, translated by Benjamin Jowett at MIT.edu
Plato's Republic, translated by Paul Shorey (1935) annotated and hyperlinked text (English and Greek) at Perseus Project
e-text Plato's Republic, translated by Benjamin Jowett with introduction at Project Gutenberg. (The same translation with Stephanus numbers, side notes and full index.)
 
 Approaching Plato: A Guide to the Early and Middle Dialogues at Belmont University

Ethics and Politics in The Republic at the Stanford Encyclopedia of Philosophy''

Political philosophy literature
Dialogues of Plato
Utopian theory
Political philosophy in ancient Greece
Justice
Political textbooks
Nag Hammadi library